The 2011 PartyPoker.net European Championship was the fourth edition of the PDC tournament, the European Championship, which allowed the top European players to compete against the highest ranked players from the PDC Order of Merit. The tournament took place at the Maritim Hotel in Düsseldorf, Germany, from 28–31 July 2011, featuring a field of 32 players and £200,000 in prize money, with £50,000 going to the winner.

World number one Phil Taylor yet again successfully defended the title, after defeating Adrian Lewis 11–8 in the final.

Prize money

Qualification
The top 16 players from the PDC Order of Merit after the World Matchplay automatically qualified for the event. The top 8 from these rankings were also the seeded players. The remaining 16 places went to the top 8 non-qualified players from the 2011 Players Championship Order of Merit, and then to the top 8 non-qualified players from the 2011 Continental Europe Order of Merit.

Draw and results

Scores after player's names are three-dart averages (total points scored divided by darts thrown and multiplied by three)

Statistics

Television coverage
The PDC announced on 24 June that ITV4 would broadcast the entire event live. ITV4 continued their coverage of PDC tournaments, having previously broadcast the 2008 European Championship, and the Grand Slam of Darts between 2007 and 2010.

The tournament was also broadcast on SPORT1 in Germany, RTL 7 in the Netherlands, and Fox Sports in Australia.

References

External links
European Championship page on the PDC's official website

European Championship (darts)
European Championship Darts
European Championship (darts)